Waray may refer to:

 Waray people of the Philippines
 Waray language, the fifth most spoken native language of the Philippines, spoken by the Waray people
 Waray literature
 Warray language, an Australian language spoken in the Adelaide River area of the Northern Territory
 Waray Sorsogon language, also known as Southern Sorsogon language, a language spoken in the Philippines

Language and nationality disambiguation pages